Harry Lampman (June 22, 1927 – June 9, 2018) was a Canadian football player who played for the Saskatchewan Roughriders, Hamilton Tiger-Cats, and Montreal Alouettes. He won the Grey Cup with Hamilton in 1957. He previously played football at and attended the Queen's University.

References

1927 births
Hamilton Tiger-Cats players
Montreal Alouettes players
Saskatchewan Roughriders players
2018 deaths
Players of Canadian football from Ontario
Sportspeople from Hamilton, Ontario